James Roosevelt Jones (born March 21, 1961) is an American former college and professional football fullback in the National Football League (NFL) for ten seasons during the 1980s and early 1990s. Jones played college football for the University of Florida and then played professionally for the Detroit Lions and the Seattle Seahawks of the NFL.

Early years 

Jones was born in Pompano Beach, Florida. He attended Blanche Ely High School in Pompano Beach, and he was a star high school football player for the Blanche Ely Mighty Tigers. Jones was so versatile in his ability to play multiple positions that he was nicknamed the "Franchise." Parade magazine named him as a high school All-American after his senior season.

In 2007, twenty-eight years after he graduated from high school, the Florida High School Athletic Association (FHSAA) recognized Jones as one of the "100 Greatest Players of the First 100 Years" of Florida high school football.

College career 

Jones received an athletic scholarship to attend the University of Florida in Gainesville, Florida, where he played for coach Charley Pell's Florida Gators football team from 1979 to 1982. During Jones' sophomore season in 1980, he was a member of the Gators team that posted the biggest one-year turnaround in the history of NCAA Division I football—from 0–10–1 in 1979 to an 8–4 bowl team in 1980.

He was a team captain in 1981 and 1982, a first-team All-Southeastern Conference (SEC) selection in 1981 and 1982, and a third-team/honorable mention All-American in 1982. He also received the Gators' Fergie Ferguson Award, recognizing the "senior football player who displays outstanding leadership, character and courage," in 1981. Jones finished his Gator career with 2,026 yards rushing, 593 yards receiving and forty-eight yards passing, and led the team in rushing yardage for three consecutive seasons from 1980 to 1982. He was later inducted into the University of Florida Athletic Hall of Fame as a "Gator Great" in 1998. In a 2006 article series published by The Gainesville Sun, the Sun sportswriters ranked him as the No. 45 all-time greatest Gator from the first century of the Florida Gators football team.

Professional career 

Jones started off for the Lions blocking for Billy Sims but became the featured back for the Lions in  when Sims was injured.

Jones finished his ten-season NFL career having played in 135 games, started ninety-one of them, rushed for 3,626 yards and twenty-six touchdowns on 1,010 carries, and caught 318 passes for 2,641 yards and ten touchdowns.

Life after the NFL 

Jones became the head football coach for his high school alma mater Blanche Ely, in 2007, but he resigned in May 2008 after a single season.

See also 

 Florida Gators football, 1970–79
 Florida Gators football, 1980–89
 List of Detroit Lions players
 List of Florida Gators in the NFL Draft
 List of University of Florida Athletic Hall of Fame members
 List of Seattle Seahawks players

References

Bibliography 
 Carlson, Norm, University of Florida Football Vault: The History of the Florida Gators, Whitman Publishing, LLC, Atlanta, Georgia (2007).  .
 Golenbock, Peter, Go Gators!  An Oral History of Florida's Pursuit of Gridiron Glory, Legends Publishing, LLC, St. Petersburg, Florida (2002).  .
 Hairston, Jack, Tales from the Gator Swamp: A Collection of the Greatest Gator Stories Ever Told, Sports Publishing, LLC, Champaign, Illinois (2002).  .
 McCarthy, Kevin M.,  Fightin' Gators: A History of University of Florida Football, Arcadia Publishing, Mount Pleasant, South Carolina (2000).  .
 Nash, Noel, ed., The Gainesville Sun Presents The Greatest Moments in Florida Gators Football, Sports Publishing, Inc., Champaign, Illinois (1998).  .

1961 births
Living people
People from Pompano Beach, Florida
Sportspeople from Broward County, Florida
Players of American football from Florida
American football running backs
Blanche Ely High School alumni
Florida Gators football players
Detroit Lions players
Seattle Seahawks players
High school football coaches in Florida
Ed Block Courage Award recipients